Haploporus septatus is a species of poroid crust fungus in the family Polyporaceae. Found in China, it causes a white rot in decomposing angiosperm wood.

Taxonomy
The fungus was collected from Ailaoshan Nature Reserve  in Jingdong County (Yunnan Province) in October 2013, and described as a new species three years later. The specific epithet septatus refers to the septate skeletal hyphae.

Description
The hymenophore, or pore surface, is white to cream coloured. The pores number around five to six per millimetre. The context has no distinct odour or taste.

The hyphal structure is dimitic, meaning that there are both generative and skeletal hyphae. The generative hyphae have clamp connections. The thick-walled, cylindrical spores typically measure 8.5–11 by 5–6 μm.

References

Fungi described in 2016
Fungi of China
Polyporaceae
Taxa named by Yu-Cheng Dai
Taxa named by Bao-Kai Cui